Six Sik Sisters is the sixth full-length studio recording from Bloomington, Indiana noise-punk quartet Racebannon.  Produced by Converge guitarist Kurt Ballou, it was released in late 2011 on Tizona Records.

Reception

Allmusic's Phil Freeman compared the album favorably to both Converge (saying that the disc has "the roomy, organic punk-metal throb he-Kurt Ballou-specializes in) and "Melvins-esque half-speed misanthropy."

Track listing
All tracks written and arranged by Racebannon
"Thee Plea" 2:44
"Thee Apology" 2:49
"Thee Interlude" :52
"Thee Brother" 3:11
"Thee Truth" 1:34
"Thee Solo" 2:45
"Thee Challenge" 2:24
"Thee Desperate" 4:05
"Thee End" 4:42

Personnel
Mike Anderson: vocal
James Bauman: guitars
Chris Saligoe: bass
Brad Williams: drums, percussion

Production
Produced, recorded and mixed by Kurt Ballou
Mastered by Alan Douches
Cover design by Aaron Tanner

References

2011 albums
Albums produced by Kurt Ballou